Leptodactylus wagneri (common name: Wagner's white-lipped frog) is a species of frog in the family Leptodactylidae. It is found in northern South America (Brazil, Colombia, Ecuador, and Peru).

Leptodactylus wagneri are found in a variety of habitats, usually not far from water: clearings, marshes and swamps, primary forest, secondary forest, terra firme forest, flooded forest, streams, and lakes. Eggs are laid in foam nests in standing water.

References

wagneri
Amphibians of Brazil
Amphibians of Colombia
Amphibians of Ecuador
Amphibians of Peru
Amphibians described in 1862
Taxa named by Wilhelm Peters
Taxonomy articles created by Polbot